The Subah of Multan or Multan Province was a subdivision of the Mughal Empire, one of the original twelve provinces of Mughals ,encompassing the southern Punjab region, stretching towards parts of Khyber, Central Punjab and Balochistan, bordering Kandahar Province and Persian Safavid Empire. It was one of the largest and important provinces of Mughal Empire.

Geography
The subah of Multan was bordered to the north by the Lahore Subah and Delhi Subah, to the west by the Safavid Empire, to the north-west by the Kabul Subah, to the east by the Ajmer Subah and Gujarat Subah and to the west by Thatta Subah.

History
The Subah of Multan was one of twelve administrative divisions created by the Mughal Emperor Akbar in 1580.

Economy
Under Mughal rule, Multan enjoyed 200 years of peace in a time when the city became known as Dar al-Aman ("Abode of Peace"). During the Mughal era, Multan was an important centre of agricultural production and manufacturing of cotton textiles. Multan was a centre for currency minting, as well as tile-making during the Mughal era.

Multan would remain an important trading centre until the city was ravaged by repeated invasions in the 18th and 19th centuries in the post-Mughal era. Many of Multan's merchants then migrated to Shikarpur in Sindh, and were found throughout Central Asia up until the 19th century.

Multan was also host to the offices of many commercial enterprises during the Mughal era, even in times when the Mughals were in control of the even more coveted city of Kandahar, given the unstable political situation resulting from frequent contestation of Kandadar with the Persian Safavid Empire.

Notable governors
The following is a list of notable governors of Multan subah appointed by the central Mughal government.

16th century
Syed Hamid Bukhari
Sadiq Khan 
Muhib Ali Khan
Rustam Mirza
Said Khan

17th century
Asaf Khan
Najabat Khan
Qulij Khan
Yusuf Khan
Najabat Khan
Qulij Khan
Saeed Khan
Murad Baksh
Saeed Khan
Aurangzeb
Bahadur Khan Rohela
Aurangzeb
Dara

See also 

 Subah of Lahore
 History of Punjab

References 

Mughal subahs
History of Multan
History of Punjab
History of Pakistan
History of India